Mount Yong Yap (Malay Gunung Yong Yap) is a mountain located along the Perak and Kelantan state border in Peninsular Malaysia. At 2,168 m, it is the 6th highest point in Peninsular Malaysia. This mountain is part of the Titiwangsa Range which is an extension of the Tennaserim Range from Thailand. There are several logging trails that lead to the mountain and are only accessible via 4WD vehicles. There have been reports of tiger attacks in the past around this area. The latest known casualty was an orang asli who got mauled to death by a Malayan tiger. There are also the usual leeches and sand flies that populate the entire mountain. The mountain trail is deemed tough as there are fallen tree trunks, sharp-edged bamboos and thorny trees that poses a lot of challenge for hikers to get to the mountain's peak. The conical shape of the mountain means having to go up an extremely steep slope to the summit. This mountain is definitely not recommended for people inexperienced at climbing mountains in the tropical rainforest. The Mount Yong Yap trek is considered to be one of the most toughest mountain treks in Peninsula Malaysia.

References  

Yong Yap